Che originali! is a 1798 farsa in one act by Simon Mayr for the Teatro San Benedetto. The libretto by Gaetano Rossi was based on an earlier French farce from 1779. It was the earliest of Mayr's works to be widely produced.

Recording
 Thomas Gropper (Don Febeo), Stefanie Früh (Aristea), Gisela Gropper, Stephen Caira (Don Carolino), Robert Merwald (Biscroma) Georgisches Kammerorchester, Franz Hauk, 2CD Guild

References

Operas
Operas by Simon Mayr
One-act operas
Operas based on plays
1798 operas